Madhuca erythrophylla is a plant in the family Sapotaceae. The specific epithet erythrophylla means "red leaves".

Description
The bark is dark brown. Inflorescences bear up to six flowers.

Distribution and habitat
Madhuca erythrophylla is native to Sumatra, Peninsular Malaysia and Borneo. Its habitat is lowland mixed dipterocarp forests from  altitude.

Conservation
Madhuca erythrophylla has been assessed as endangered on the IUCN Red List. The species is threatened by logging and conversion of land for palm oil plantations.

References

erythrophylla
Trees of Sumatra
Trees of Peninsular Malaysia
Trees of Borneo
Plants described in 1906